
The following are lists of Universal Pictures films by decade:

Lists 
List of Universal Pictures films (1912–1919)
List of Universal Pictures films (1920–1929)
List of Universal Pictures films (1930–1939)
List of Universal Pictures films (1940–1949)
List of Universal Pictures films (1950–1959)
List of Universal Pictures films (1960–1969)
List of Universal Pictures films (1970–1979)
List of Universal Pictures films (1980–1989)
List of Universal Pictures films (1990–1999)
List of Universal Pictures films (2000–2009)
List of Universal Pictures films (2010–2019)
List of Universal Pictures films (2020–2029)

See also
 Universal Pictures
 :Category:Lists of films by studio

External links

 Universal Pictures

Universal

Universal
Lists of Universal Pictures films